This is a list of FM radio stations in the United States having call signs beginning with the letters WG through WJ. Low-power FM radio stations, those with designations such as WGAF-LP, have not been included in this list.

WG--

WH--

WI--

WJ--

See also
 North American call sign

FM radio stations in the United States by call sign (initial letters WG-WJ)